Gero Merhart von Bernegg (17 October 1886 in Bregenz – 4 March 1959) was a German archaeologist. Although he worked at the same time when German nationalism and Nazi archaeology was dominant in Germany, he was not a "Nazi archaeologist".  He came into conflict with Hans Reinerth.

1886 births
1959 deaths
Austrian archaeologists
People from Bregenz
20th-century archaeologists